In mathematics, the Iwasawa conjecture may be:

the main conjecture of Iwasawa theory
the Ferrero–Washington theorem about the vanishing of Iwasawa's μ-invariant for cyclotomic extensions